Qun-Quran or Qun-Qiran (r. 1251 – c. 1280) was the khan of the White Horde, left wing of the Golden Horde.

According to Jami al-Tawarikh ("Compendium of Chronicles") by Rashid-al-Din Hamadani, Qun-Quran was the fourth son of Orda, the eldest son of Jochi.

In 1256, a contingent of the Golden Horde under Qun Quran's eldest brother Kuli dispatched in Persia to assist Hulagu. Sometime after the Siege of Baghdad (1258), Kuli died in uncertain circumstances which constrained the Jochids' relationship with the Ilkhanate. During his rule, some descendants of Orda supported the election of Ariq Böke and sided with him in the Toluid Civil War against Kublai in the early 1260s.

When he died, he left no male heir. Therefore, his nephew Köchü succeeded him.

Genealogy
Genghis Khan
Jochi
Orda Khan
Qun-Quran

See also
List of Khans of the Golden Horde

Nomadic groups in Eurasia
Khans of the White Horde
13th-century monarchs in Asia
13th-century Mongol rulers